Sergei Sergeyevich Arkhipov (born 15 December 1996) is a Russian football player. He plays for Spartak Tambov.

Club career
He made his debut in the Russian Football National League for FC Tambov on 4 March 2018 in a game against FC Rotor Volgograd.

Personal life
He is a twin brother of Artyom Arkhipov, who is also a professional footballer.

References

External links
 Profile by Russian Football National League
 
 

1996 births
Footballers from Tambov
Twin sportspeople
Russian twins
Living people
Russian footballers
Association football forwards
FC Tambov players
FC Metallurg Lipetsk players
FC Gorodeya players
FC Urozhay Krasnodar players
FC Spartak Moscow players
Russian First League players
Russian Second League players
Belarusian Premier League players
Russian expatriate footballers
Russian expatriate sportspeople in Belarus
Expatriate footballers in Belarus